Hermann Höpker-Aschoff (31 January 1883 – 15 January 1954) was a German politician, finance minister, a member of Parlamentarischer Rat and a jurist. He was the first President of the Federal Constitutional Court of Germany.

Höpker-Aschoff studied law and economics in Jena, Munich and Bonn. He taught monetary theory and finance as professor at the University of Bonn.

References

External links
 

1883 births
1954 deaths
People from Herford
People from the Province of Westphalia
German Protestants
German Democratic Party politicians
German State Party politicians
Members of the Reichstag of the Weimar Republic
Members of the Bundestag for North Rhine-Westphalia
Finance ministers of Prussia
Justices of the Federal Constitutional Court
University of Jena alumni
Academic staff of the University of Bonn
German military personnel of World War I
Members of the Bundestag for the Free Democratic Party (Germany)
Members of Parlamentarischer Rat